Haifa Yousef Fadel Najjar (born Zarqa, 1959) is the Jordanian Minister of Culture. She was appointed as minister on 11 October 2021.

Education 
Najjar completed a degree in population studies at the University of Jordan before attaining a master's degree in transformational management at the University of Buckingham. She was a founding member of the Board of Trustees of The King's Academy and a board member of the Greater Amman Municipality. Najjar worked at the Ahliyyah School for Girls from 1984, and was Principal at both Ahliyyah and the Bishop's School for Girls since 2008.

Honours
Najjar was awarded the Al-Hussein Humanitarian Leadership Prize (2001), the El-Hassan Bin Talal Award for Academic Excellence (2002), and the European Council of International Schools (ECIS) Award for the Promotion of International Education (2009). She received the Lanfranc Award for Education and Scholarship from Justin Welby, Archbishop of Canterbury, in 2017 "for her outstanding contribution to education in Jordan and her exemplary leading role in Jordanian society as a Christian woman."

References 

1959 births
People from Zarqa
Living people
21st-century Jordanian women politicians
21st-century Jordanian politicians
Culture ministers of Jordan
Women government ministers of Jordan
Alumni of the University of Buckingham
University of Jordan alumni